Shalë (Albanian: or Shala; , Salce) is a settlement in the municipality of Vushtrri, District of Mitrovica, Kosovo.

See also 
 Vushtrri

Notes

References

Villages in Vushtrri